The Associated Brotherhood of Christians is a Christian religious denomination. The meetings to found the group first took place in 1933, under the direction of E. E. Partridge and H. A. Riley, and the group was incorporated during World War II.

References

External links
 Official site 

Nontrinitarian denominations
Christian organizations established in 1933